Linda Y. Cureton (born 1959 in Bethesda, Maryland) is the chief executive officer and founder of Muse Technologies, Inc. A former NASA CIO, Ms. Cureton launched her company in April 2013.

Education 
Cureton attended Washington, DC public schools and was in the first graduating class of Duke Ellington School of the Arts in 1977. In 1980, she graduated from Howard University with a BS in Mathematics. She later received a Master of Science degree and post-Masters advanced certificate in Applied Mathematics at Johns Hopkins University. Cureton earned a Doctor of Philosophy in Organizational Leadership from University of Maryland Eastern Shore in 2020.

Career 
Cureton created the NASA CIO blog and helped other federal CIOs with the professional use of social media.

She has written several articles for Federal Computer Week, FedScoop, and Institute for Electrical and Electronics Engineers and is a monthly contributor to Information Week Government.  She currently serves on advisory boards for: the Open Systems Software Institute, the Professional Capture Management Forum, and the DC Youth Orchestra Program. Some of her former professional affiliations have included the Armed Forces Communications and Electronics Association, Gartner Group Information Technology Executive Program, Women in Technology, American Council for Technology, Government Information Technology Executive Council and the Society for Information Management, Advanced Practices Council. She is the author of The Leadership Muse a book that offers lessons for leaders.

Selected publications

Selected awards and recognitions
2008 IT Service Management Forum (ITSMF) Heritage Award
2009 InformationWeek Government CIO 50
2009 Washington Business Journal Women Who Mean Business 
2011 Minority Enterprise Executive Council 50 Women of Influence and Power Award
2011 Federal Computer Week Fed 100 
2011 Washingtonian Magazine Tech Titans 
2011 Womensphere Global Leadership Award for Innovation 
2012 National Urban League of Northern Virginia for Leadership in Science, Technology, Engineering and Mathematics
2012 Business Insider 25 Powerful Women Engineers

References

External links

1959 births
Living people
People from Bethesda, Maryland
Howard University alumni
Johns Hopkins University alumni
Businesspeople from Maryland